Dietrich Ritter Kralik von Meyrswalden (15 August 1884 – 27 December 1959) was an Austrian philologist who specialized in Germanic studies.

Biography
Dietrich Kralik was born in Vienna, Austria-Hungary on 15 August 1884. He belonged to the  family of Bohemian nobility, and was the son of philosopher  and brother of musician . He received his Ph.D. in Germanic philology at the University of Vienna under the supervision of Rudolf Much.

Kralik served as a professor at the University of Würzburg from 1923 to 1924. In 1924 he was appointed a professor at the University of Vienna. Kralik was Dean of the Faculty for Philosophy of the University of Vienna from 1934 to 1935. Kralik became Member of the Austrian Academy of Sciences in 1935, where he served as Head of the Dictionary Commission and Secretary of the Philosophical-Historical Class. Kralik was a known expert on the Nibelungenlied.

A member of the Nazi Party, Meyrswalden was fired from the University of Vienna after the end of World War II. Kralik was however rehabilitated in 1949, and subsequently reappointed a professor at the University, and subsequently became Head of the Institute for Germanic Studies. Kralik retired from his university duties in 1955, and was subsequently appointed an honorary professor. He was succeeded by Otto Höfler as Head of the Institute for Germanic Studies. Kralik died in Vienna on 27 December 1959, and is buried at the Döbling Cemetery.

See also
 Richard Wolfram
 Walter Steinhauser
 Siegfried Gutenbrunner

Selected works
 als Herausgeber mit Fritz Lemmermayer: Neue Hebbel-Dokumente. Schuster & Löffler, Berlin u. a. 1913.
 Die deutschen Bestandteile der Lex Baiuvariorum. In: Neues Archiv der Gesellschaft für Ältere deutsche Geschichtskunde. Bd. 38, 1913, S. 13–55, 401–449, 581–624.
 Deutsche Heldendichtung. In: Otto Brunner, Alfons Dopsch, Hans Eibl: Das Mittelalter in Einzeldarstellungen (= Wissenschaft und Kultur. Bd. 3). F. Deuticke, Leipzig u. a. 1930, S. 168–193.
 Die Überlieferung und Entstehung der Thidrekssaga (= Rheinische Beiträge und Hülfsbücher zur germanischen Philologie und Volkskunde. Bd. 19). Niemeyer, Halle (Saale) 1931.
 Die Sigfridtrilogie im Nibelungenlied und in der Thidrekssaga. Niemeyer, Halle (Saale) 1941.
 Das Nibelungenlied, 1941
 Passau im Nibelungenlied. In: Österreichische Akademie der Wissenschaften. Anzeiger der Philosophisch-historische Klasse. Bd. 87, Nr. 20, 1950, S. 451–470.
 Die Elegie Walthers von der Vogelweide (= Österreichische Akademie der Wissenschaften. Philosophisch-historische Klasse. Sitzungsberichte. Bd. 228, Abh. 1). Rohrer in Kommission, Wien 1952.
 Wer war der Dichter des Nibelungenliedes? Österreichischer Bundesverlag, Wien 1954.
 Walther gegen Reinmar (= Österreichische Akademie der Wissenschaften. Philosophisch-historische Klasse. Sitzungsberichte. Bd. 230, Abh. 1). Rohrer in Kommission, Wien 1955.
 Die dänische Ballade von Grimhilds Rache und die Vorgeschichte des Nibelungenliedes (= Österreichische Akademie der Wissenschaften. Philosophisch-historische Klasse. Sitzungsberichte. Bd. 241, Abh. 1). Aus dem Nachlass herausgegeben. Böhlau in Kommission, Graz u. a. 1962.

Sources

 

1884 births
1959 deaths
Austrian non-fiction writers
Austrian philologists
Germanists
Germanic studies scholars
Members of the Austrian Academy of Sciences
University of Vienna alumni
Academic staff of the University of Vienna
Academic staff of the University of Würzburg
20th-century philologists